Tomás Balcázar González (4 May 1931 – 26 April 2020) was a Mexican professional footballer who played as a forward. He played at club level for Guadalajara, and internationally for Mexico.

Football career
Tomás was a legend in Mexico for being in the "campeonísimo", which refers to the historic Guadalajara team that won 8 championships in 10 years.

International career
In the 1954 FIFA World Cup, Balcazar scored for Mexico against France. When he scored that goal Tomás was 22 years old, the same age his grandson Javier Hernández was during the 2010 FIFA World Cup when he scored against the French on 17 June 2010.

Personal life
Balcázar was the grandfather of Javier Hernández Balcázar (Chicharito), a Mexican international footballer who is currently playing for American club LA Galaxy.  Balcázar was the father-in-law of Javier Hernández Gutiérrez, who played for Tecos and was a member of the Mexico squad at the 1986 FIFA World Cup. On 5 June he married Berta Calloino in Mexico City.

References

External links

1931 births
2020 deaths
Footballers from Guadalajara, Jalisco
Mexico international footballers
C.D. Guadalajara footballers
1954 FIFA World Cup players
Mexican footballers
Liga MX players
Association football forwards